Paola Duguet (born October 1, 1987 in New York, United States) is a Colombian-American Olympic freestyle swimmer. She swam for Colombia at the 2004 Olympics, swimming the 400 (29th) and 800 frees (27th).

Paola started swimming at the age of 5 with the Briarcliff Manor Summer Swim Team. By the age of 10, she was ranked #1 in the United States in the 50-yard breaststroke. She consistently ranked among the Top16 fastest swimmers in her age group through the years, winning many Metropolitan Junior Olympics High Point Awards and competing in 8 consecutive Eastern Zone Championships.

With her Badger Swim Club teammates, Kim Kelly, Bridget O'Connor, and Whitney Sprague, they broke one of the longest standing U.S. National Age Group Records in the 15-16 year olds 800-freestyle relay held by Mission Viejo Swim Club.

In 2003, she participated in her first Colombian National Championships, the first step towards representing that country in the 2004 Summer Olympics.  There she won 9 gold medals and established two new Colombian records.  In February 2004 she represented Colombia in the 2004 South American Championships in Maldonado, Uruguay, corroborating her qualifying times for Athens and winning bronze in the 800 m freestyle.  Paola represented Colombia in many international events, including the World Championships in Montreal, the South American Championships in Chile and in Uruguay, the Juegos Bolivarianos in Colombia, among others.

Paola graduated from Hackley School in 2005 where she set new school records in the Girls 200-yd and 500-yd freestyle while in the eighth grade.  She attended Harvard College from where she graduated in 2009.

References

1987 births
Living people
American sportspeople of Colombian descent
Colombian female freestyle swimmers
Colombian female swimmers
Olympic swimmers of Colombia
Swimmers at the 2004 Summer Olympics
Sportspeople from New York City
Harvard College alumni
People from Briarcliff Manor, New York
American female swimmers
21st-century American women
Harvard Crimson women's swimmers